State Route 370 (SR 370) is a 5.8 mile long north-south state highway in Union County, Tennessee. It connects the community of Potato Valley with the cities of Plainview and Maynardville.

Route description
SR 370 begins just northwest of Plainview at an intersection with SR 144. It goes northeast as an unnamed roadway between two ridges before joining Bull Run Road after crossing a ridge. The highway, now known as Bull Run Road, goes down a valley as it passes through the community of Potato Valley. SR 370 then leaves the community and continues northeast through farmland to come to an end at an intersection with SR 61 just southeast of Maynardville. The entire route of SR 370 is a rural two-lane highway.

Major intersections

References

370
Transportation in Union County, Tennessee